Vagay is the name of several rural localities in Tyumen Oblast, Russia:
Vagay, Omutinsky District, Tyumen Oblast, a selo in Vagaysky Rural Okrug of Omutinsky District
Vagay, Vagaysky District, Tyumen Oblast, a selo in Pervovagaysky Rural Okrug of Vagaysky District